Abdul Manaf Umar Gumah is a Ghanaian professional footballer who plays as a midfielder for Ghanaian Premier league side Accra Hearts of Oak.

Career 
Manaf started his career with Accra Hearts of Oak junior side Auroras FC who play in the Ghana Division Two League. In January 2019, he was promoted by coach Kim Grant as he signed his first professional contract for Hearts of Oak ahead of the 2019 GFA Normalization Committee Special Competition. In July 2019, he extended contract with the club.

Honours 
Hearts of Oak

 Ghana Premier League: 2020–21
Ghanaian FA Cup: 2021

References

External links 

 

Year of birth missing (living people)
Living people
Ghanaian footballers
Association football midfielders
Accra Hearts of Oak S.C. players